Jocelyn Gould is a Canadian jazz guitarist. Her album, Elegant Traveler was awarded the 2021 Juno Award for Jazz Album of the Year - Solo. She is also the 1st place winner of the 2018 Wilson Centre International Jazz Guitar competition.

She is a graduate of the University of Manitoba, and later received her Master's of Music at Michigan State University. Gould has performed alongside many notable musicians including Freddy Cole, Jodi Proznick, Laila Biali, Allison Au, and Will Bonness.

Gould is currently a faculty member and Head of Guitar Department at Humber College. Her debut album, Elegant Traveler was released in 2020, and her second album Golden Hour was released in 2022.

Discography

As bandleader 

 Golden Hour - 2022
 Elegant Traveller - 2020

As side person 

 The Ostara Project - 2022, with Jodi Proznick and Amanda Tosoff
 Stranger Than Fiction - 2021, Jon Gordon (musician)
 No Bounds - 2021, Caity Gyorgy

 Change of Plans - 2020, Will Bonness
 Never More Here - 2020, Michael Dease

Singles 

 It's A Human Race - 2022, Fraser MacPherson
 I Miss Missing You - 2022, Caity Gyorgy

References 

Canadian jazz guitarists
Women jazz guitarists
Juno Award for Jazz Album of the Year – Solo winners
Living people
University of Manitoba alumni
Michigan State University alumni
Academic staff of Humber College
Year of birth missing (living people)